Taking a Chance on Love is an album by American jazz singer Jane Monheit that includes cover versions of standards and songs from musicals. The album was released on September 7, 2004, via Sony Classical label.

Background
This was Monheit's fifth album and fourth studio album, her first album with Sony. Taking a Chance on Love was her first collaboration with Grammy Award-winning producers Peter Asher and Al Schmitt. She sang on the album Session 55 by Les Brown, which Schmitt produced.

During the album's first week of release, it entered the pop chart on Billboard magazine and reached number one on the Traditional Jazz chart. The song "Dancing in the Dark" received a Grammy Award nomination for Best Instrumental Arrangement Accompanying Vocals.

Monheit recorded "Honeysuckle Rose" with Wynton Marsalis on the album In Full Swing by Mark O'Connor. The bonus track "Over the Rainbow" appeared on the soundtrack Sky Captain and the World of Tomorrow. The bonus track "I Should Care" is from Legends of Jazz with Ramsey Lewis: Season One, Vol. 2 (2006).

Track listing

EP releases
A four-track EP and a two-track EP release of Monheit's album Taking a Chance on Love were released as limited editions in 2004.

Chart positions

Personnel
 Jane Monheit – vocals
 Michael Bublé – vocals
 Ron Carter – bass
 Christian McBride – bass
 Orlando le Fleming – bass
 Romero Lubambo – guitar
 Miles Okazaki – guitar
 Geoffrey Keezer – piano
 Michael Kanan – piano, arranger
 Rob Mounsey – piano, arranger
 Joel Frahm – alto, soprano, and tenor saxophones
 Donald Harrison – alto saxophone
 Michael Davis – horn
 Lawrence Feldman – horn
 Jim Hynes – horn
 Bob Malach – horn
 Roger Rosenberg – horn
 Andy Snitzer – horn
 Lew Soloff – horn
 David Taylor – horn
 Rick Montalbano – drums
 Lewis Nash – drums

Technical
 Peter Asher – producer
 Laraine Perri – producer
 Al Schmitt – producer, engineer, mixing
 Brian Montgomery – engineer
 Vince Mendoza – arranger, conductor
 Alan Broadbent – arranger, conductor
 Jorge Calandrelli – arranger, conductor
 Edward Shearmur – arranger, conductor
 Joe Soldo – conductor

References

2004 albums
Albums produced by Peter Asher
Jane Monheit albums